Private Hell 36 is a 1954 American crime film noir directed by Don Siegel starring Ida Lupino, Steve Cochran, Howard Duff, Dean Jagger and Dorothy Malone.

The picture was one of the last feature-length efforts by Filmakers, an independent company created by producer Collier Young and his star and then-wife Ida Lupino.

Plot
L.A. police detectives Cal Bruner and Jack Farnham are partners.  After a fleeing suspect is killed, they discover a box filled with money and Bruner pockets $80,000 over Farnham's objections.  Farnham reluctantly accepts a key to a safe deposit box so that he can access his half, but he immediately becomes agitated and racked with guilt.  Bruner receives a call from the dead man's partner threatening to reveal the cop's deceit unless he gets his money back.  Farnham demands that they turn in the money, but Bruner says he intends to murder the blackmailer and claim self-defense.  Bruner finally agrees to return the money instead, but he is actually preparing to kill his own partner.  When the crook suddenly shows up Bruner wounds Farnham, but Bruner is killed by a shot from the dark.  Their boss, Captain Michaels, appears and reveals that the blackmailing crook was just a ruse.

Cast
 Ida Lupino as Lilli Marlowe
 Steve Cochran as Cal Bruner
 Howard Duff as Jack Farnham
 Dean Jagger as Capt. Michaels
 Dorothy Malone as Francey Farnham
 King Donovan as 	Evney Serovitch
 Dabbs Greer as Sam Marvin
 William Boyett as 	Stimson 
 Tom Monroe as Patrolman Tom 
 Richard Deacon as Mr. Mace 
 James Anderson as Patrolman in Locker Room
 Bridget Duff as Bridget Farnham
 Kenneth Patterson as Detective Lt. Lubin 
 Chester Conklin as 	Murdered Man

Background
The extensive racetrack scenes in the film were shot at Hollywood Park Racetrack in Inglewood, California. The interiors of real bars and shops were used so the actors could walk out into actual streets within the same scene.

The film starts with a pre-credit sequence before the first titles appear in an early modernist foreshadowing of the action teaser before it became commonplace on television series of the sixties. Typical of The Film[m]akers productions the last title card misspells “Made in Holl[y]wood, USA.“

The film is notable as one of the early Siegel B movies on which future auteur Sam Peckinpah (credited under his first name of David) learned his craft as a dialogue director.

Reception
Film critic Bosley Crowther wrote a tepid review, "A critic might note that attention is sharply divided between the main theme and the incidental character that Miss Lupino plays. This is somewhat understandable, since Miss Lupino happens to be one of the partners in Filmakers and a coauthor of the script. But let's not worry about it. No deplorable damage is done. There's not very much here to damage. Just an average melodrama about cops."

References

External links
 
 
 
 
 Private Hell 36 at Film Noir of the Week by Megan Abbott

1954 films
1954 crime drama films
American crime drama films
American black-and-white films
Film noir
Films about police officers
Films about corruption in the United States
Films directed by Don Siegel
Films scored by Leith Stevens
Films set in Los Angeles
Films set in New York City
1950s police procedural films
American police detective films
1950s English-language films
1950s American films